Wendy Elizabeth Mackay (born on ) is a Canadian researcher specializing in human-computer interaction. She has served in all of the roles on the SIGCHI committee, including Chair. She is a member of the CHI Academy and a recipient of a European Research Council Advanced grant. She has been a visiting professor in Stanford University between 2010 and 2012, and received the ACM SIGCHI Lifetime Service Award in 2014.

She leads research at Exsitu, while serving as research director with INRIA Saclay in France. Her research investigates of human computer interaction (HCI) and aims to develop and to facilitate the  interfaces that provide users with the tools needed to accomplish the task at hand.

Education
Mackay received a Bachelor of Arts degree in Psychology from University of California, San Diego in 1977. She received a Master of Science in Experimental Psychology from Northeastern University in 1979 and a Doctor of Philosophy in Computer Science from  Massachusetts Institute of Technology in 1990. Her doctoral research was supervised by Wanda Orlikowski.

Career and research
After graduating from MIT, Mackay formed a multimedia research group at Digital Equipment Corporation. There, she created over 30 multimedia projects, including the first interactive video system which was titled IVIS. She then continued to manage research groups at MIT and eventually worked as a senior research scientist at Xerox PARC where she published an award-winning special issue of Communications of the ACM on computer augmented environments. She also worked on augmented paper interfaces and explored the integration of paper with the online world. Afterward, she taught at University of Aarhus, University of Paris-Sud, and Stanford University as a visiting professor.

Her scientific contributions include writing the original toolkit software for IVIS, the world's first interactive video system. She also conducted the first major study of electronic mail while at MIT. Her design methods are taught in institutions around the world such as Stanford, MIT, Georgia Tech, and University of British Columbia. Mackay has published over two hundred research articles on human-computer interaction and has served as program chair or on the program committees of ACM Conference on Human Factors in Computing Systems (CHI), ACM Symposium on User Interface Software and Technology (UIST), ACM Computer-supported cooperative work (CSCW), ACM DIS and ACM Multimedia.

Awards and honors
 2009, Elected a member of the CHI Academy

 2009, Conference on Human Factors in Computing Systems (CHI) best paper award, top 1% of accepted papers, for Musink: Composing Music through Augmented Drawing 
 2011, SIGCHI Best Paper Award: Mid-air Pan-and-Zoom on Wall-sized Displays 
 2014, SIGCHI Lifetime Service Award 
 2019, ACM Fellow "for contributions to human-computer interaction, mixed reality and participatory design, and leadership in ACM SIGCHI".
 2020, Suffrage Science award

Personal life
Wendy married Michel Beaudouin-Lafon on August 11, 1993 in Avalon, California. She has two sons - Alexandre and Matthew Thomas Beaudouin-Mackay.

References

Canadian women computer scientists
Canadian computer scientists
Fellows of the Association for Computing Machinery
Living people
1956 births